Brigadier General George Reynolds Scott Burrows (1827–1917) was the commander of the British and Indian forces in the disastrous Battle of Maiwand during the Second Anglo-Afghan War. Although his tactics received criticism, he was exonerated and later promoted.

References

British Indian Army generals
British military personnel of the Second Anglo-Afghan War
1917 deaths
1827 births